Paul Bosch (born 24 September 1984 in Pretoria, South Africa) is a professional German rugby union player, of South African origin. He usually plays as a centre.

Career
In 2003-04, Bosch played an entire season for Ponteland Rugby Club in Northumberland, England.
He currently plays for the US Nevers (France) after signing from Montpellier in Top 14 (2011-2013), Western Province (2008-2011) and Leopards (2006-2008) in South Africa's Currie Cup, and the Stormers in Super Rugby (2011).

On 14 February 2015, he made his debut for Germans against Russia.

References

External links 
WP rugby profile

Living people
1984 births
South African rugby union players
Stormers players
Western Province (rugby union) players
Leopards (rugby union) players
Rugby union centres
Rugby union players from Pretoria
University of Pretoria alumni